Wang Shoudao (April 13, 1906 – September 13, 1996), original name Wang Fanglin was a People's Republic of China politician. He was born in Liuyang, Hunan Province. He joined the Communist Party of China in 1925. He was governor of his home province. He was minister of transport (1958–1964). He was CPPCC Committee Chairman of Guangdong.

1906 births
1996 deaths
People's Republic of China politicians from Hunan
Chinese Communist Party politicians from Hunan
Governors of Hunan
Political office-holders in Hunan
Political office-holders in Guangdong
People from Liuyang
Chinese Red Army generals
CPPCC Committee Chairmen of Guangdong
Delegates to the 1st National People's Congress
Ministers of Transport of the People's Republic of China
Vice-ministers of transport of the People's Republic of China
Vice Chairpersons of the National Committee of the Chinese People's Political Consultative Conference
Politicians from Changsha
Generals from Hunan